Paul James O'Grady (born 6 November 1978), is an Australian former professional footballer.

Early life
O'Grady grew up in Engadine, in Sydney's south.

Career
O'Grady played for Central Coast Mariners for four seasons, making 42 appearances in all competitions before being released by the club in May 2009. His only goal in the A-League came from a corner kick in a win over Sydney FC on 13 October 2006.

O'Grady signed with APIA Leichhardt Tigers in December 2009.

Honours

Club
Wollongong Wolves
 Oceania Club Championship: 2001

Central Coast Mariners
 A-League Premiership: 2007–08

See also
List of Central Coast Mariners FC players

References

External links
 
 Oz Football profile

1978 births
Living people
Australian people of Irish descent
Sportsmen from New South Wales
Association football defenders
Soccer players from Sydney
A-League Men players
National Soccer League (Australia) players
Parramatta Power players
Central Coast Mariners FC players
Parramatta FC players
Wollongong Wolves FC players
Australian soccer players